Miss USA 1987 was the 36th Miss USA pageant, televised live on February 17 from Albuquerque, New Mexico on CBS. The ceremonies were hosted for the last time by Bob Barker. At the conclusion of the final competition, Michelle Royer of Texas was crowned Miss USA, becoming the third consecutive winner from Texas.

Results

Placements

Final competition score

 Winner
 First runner-up
 Second runner-up
 Third runner-up
 Fourth runner-up

Special awards
Congeniality: Lori Lynn Dickerson (California)
Photogenic: Sophia Bowen (Georgia)
Best State Costume: Kriston Gayle Killgore (New Mexico)

Background music
Opening Number: "Everybody Have Fun Tonight" by Wang Chung (Cover version) and "Victory" by Kool and the Gang

Historical significance 
 Texas wins competition for the fourth time and third in a row. 
 Florida earns the 1st runner-up position for the second time. The last time it placed this was in 1958.
 Arizona earns the 2nd runner-up position for the second time. The last time it placed this was in 1971. Also this was the highest placement since Jineane Ford in 1980.
 Missouri earns the 3rd runner-up position for the third time. The last time it placed this was in 1984.
 Georgia earns the 4th runner-up position for the fourth time. The last time it placed this was in 1970.
 States that placed in semifinals the previous year were Georgia, Illinois, Mississippi and Texas.
 Texas placed for the thirteenth consecutive year.
 Illinois placed for the fourth consecutive year. 
 Georgia and Mississippi made their second consecutive placement.
 Arizona, Missouri and New Mexico last placed in 1985.
 West Virginia last placed in 1984.
 Nevada last placed in 1983.
 Virginia last placed in 1982.
 Florida last placed in 1980.
 Oklahoma breaks an ongoing streak of placements since 1983.
Note: This is the final year that Bob Barker hosted the pageant after 20 consecutive years (1967-1987). His stance on fur coats being given as prizes and being worn by the top 11 during the telecast's swimsuit completion resulted in a great deal of media attention surrounding the issue. Bob Barker resigned and Alan Thicke became the host in 1988.

Delegates

 Alabama - Rhonda Garrett
 Alaska - Shelly Dunlevy
 Arizona - Diane Lynn Martin
 Arkansas - Sheri Smeltzer
 California - Lori Lynn Dickerson
 Colorado - Polly Kuska
 Connecticut - Jolene Foy
 Delaware - Shellie Haralson
 District of Columbia - Edwina Richard
 Florida - Clotilde “Cloe” Helen Cabrera
 Georgia - Sophia Marie Bowen
 Hawaii - Deborah Laslo
 Idaho - Vicki Hoffman
 Illinois - Joan Elizabeth Berge
 Indiana - Alecia Rae Masalkoski
 Iowa - Katy Lynn Magee
 Kansas - Martina Castle
 Kentucky - Beth Ann Clark
 Louisiana - Carol Carter
 Maine - Ginger Kilgore
 Maryland - Michelle Snow
 Massachusetts - Rosanna Iversen
 Michigan - Elizabeth Puleo
 Minnesota - Christine Rosenberger
 Mississippi - Katharine Clare Manning
 Missouri - Dawn Theresa Fonseca
 Montana - Constance Colla
 Nebraska - Amy Anderson
 Nevada - Tammy Lee Perkins
 New Hampshire - Laurie Durkee
 New Jersey - Stacey Fox
 New Mexico - Kriston Gayle Killgore
 New York - Constance McCullough
 North Carolina - Donna Wilson
 North Dakota - Shelley Gangness
 Ohio - Hallie Bonnell
 Oklahoma - Dyan Rody
 Oregon - Tamara Primiano
 Pennsylvania - Lisa Rynkiewicz
 Rhode Island - Lisa Benson
 South Carolina - Elizabeth Woodard
 South Dakota - Jana van Woudenberg
 Tennessee - Molly Brown
 Texas - Michelle Renee Royer
 Utah - Patty Thorpe
 Vermont - Carole Woodworth
 Virginia - Marsha Ann Ralls
 Washington - Jennifer Doerflinger
 West Virginia - Paula Jean Morrison
 Wisconsin - Regina Maria Part
 Wyoming - Michelle Renee Zimermann
Miss Teen USA 1986 - Allison Brown
'''

Judges
Rebeca Arthur
Doug Higgins
Betty Hyatt-Aikman
Rhett Turner
Lisa Brown
Marc Schwartz
Caryn Richman
Dick Zimmerman
Kim Morgan Greene
Gwen Jones
Fred Travalena

Controversy
Host Bob Barker, a fervent animal rights activist, threatened to pull out of the pageant when he discovered that the delegates would be wearing real fur coats during the swimsuit competition segment. As Barker was already in New Mexico at the time, there was no time to find a replacement host and pageant officials agreed to a change. The delegates wore simulated fur for the segment, but real fur was still given as a prize to the Miss USA winner. Barker went on to host the 1987 Miss Universe pageant held in Singapore in May before stepping down for good.

See also
Miss Universe 1987
Miss Teen USA 1987

References

1987
February 1987 events in the United States
1987 beauty pageants
1987
1987 in New Mexico